Tobias Mohr (born 24 August 1995) is a German footballer who plays as a left midfielder for Schalke 04.

On 8 June 2022, he agreed to join Schalke 04, newly promoted to the Bundesliga, signing a three-year contract.

Career statistics

References

External links
 Profile at the FC Schalke 04 website
 Profile at DFB.de
 Profile at kicker.de

1995 births
Living people
Sportspeople from Aachen
Footballers from North Rhine-Westphalia
German footballers
Association football defenders
Alemannia Aachen players
SpVgg Greuther Fürth II players
SpVgg Greuther Fürth players
1. FC Heidenheim players
FC Schalke 04 players
Bundesliga players
2. Bundesliga players
Regionalliga players